Orquesta La Solución is a Puerto Rican trombone-based salsa band, founded by bassist Roberto Rivera in 1973.

The band's singers included Frankie Ruiz who started a solo career after hits with the band "La Rueda" and "Chiquito Corazoncito." Band instrumentalists have included Israel Tanenbaum. The band recorded for the Venezuelan T.H. Records, later known as TH-Rodven Records and finally Rodven Records until 1991.

Discography
 "La Juma De Ayer" (Performance records, 1975) Vocals: Esteban "Tato Rico" Ramírez & Jaime "Megüi" Rivera.
 "Roberto Rivera & La Solución" (Performance records, 1979) (First album with Frankie Ruiz), later reedited as "Frankie Ruiz y La Solución"
 "Orquesta La Solución" also known as "La Rueda" (LAD records (Later T.H. Records), 1980)
 La Solución! also known as "Una Canita Aire" (LAD - T.H. Records, 1981)
 Orquesta La Solución (LAD - T.H. Records, 1982)
 La Solución (T.H. Records, 1983)
 Una Canita Más (T.H. Records, 1985)
 Brindemos (T.H. Records, 1986)
 Buena Pesca (TH-Rodven, 1987)
 El Original De Puerto Rico (TH-Rodven, 1989)
 Clasico (TH-Rodven, 1991)
 A Bailar Pa Dentro (Paradisc Records - BMG Music International, 1993)
 Alcanzar Una Estrella (AVL Records, 1999)
 30 Aniversario (SMG Productions, 2005)
 A Través Del Tiempo (Puerto Rico Records, 2008)
 Refreshing (Eddie Ramos Productions, 2012)
 Viajero del Tiempo (Jokha Management, Expecting time frame 2014)

References

External links
 http://www.salsaclasica.com/lasolucion/
 http://www.orquestalasolucion.net
 http://www.jokha.net

Salsa music groups
Rodven Records artists
Puerto Rican musical groups